Mierczyce  is a village in the administrative district of Gmina Wądroże Wielkie, within Jawor County, Lower Silesian Voivodeship, in south-western Poland.

Notable people
 Bolko von Richthofen (1899 – 1983) German archaeologist

References

Mierczyce